The Mageean Cup is awarded annually to the winners of the Ulster Colleges' Senior Hurling Championship. This iconic trophy was presented to Ulster Colleges in 1963 by the staff and students of Dromantine College, Newry in memory of Most Reverend Daniel Mageean, Bishop of Down and Connor (1929 – 1962). 
St Mary's CBGS Belfast are the cup specialists with 28 titles. The cup has spent most of its time in the Belfast school with only St Patricks Maghera challenging their dominance.

Dromantine College was an SMA seminary (Society of African Missions), and is now a well known Retreat Centre. The Dromantine seminarians actually played an Ulster Colleges’ hurling select in a challenge game in 1963, probably to mark the presentation of the new trophy to the Ulster Colleges Council.

From its formation in 1928, it is apparent that the activities of theUlster Colleges Council reflected the fact that football had an appeal throughout the province of Ulster while interest in hurling had a narrower geographical focus. The diocesan colleges were boarding schools which drew their students in the main from their own dioceses, so those colleges were consequently football orientated and were focussed on the MacRory Cup. St Malachy's College Belfast was the only one with a strong interest in hurling.

On the other hand, the day schools were run by the Christian Brothers, many of whom came from strong hurling counties and backgrounds in the South. In the 1930s Abbey CBS represented Down in inter-county hurling at minor level, winning a couple of provincial titles and appearing in All-Ireland semi-finals. St Mary's CBS, Belfast had both this encouragement from the Brothers and an intake that was from local clubs which played hurling, while there was occasionally strong hurling involvement from Omagh CBS, Armagh CBS and St Patrick's Downpatrick.

After the war, the establishment of a second boarding school in Down and Connor at Garron Tower (St MacNissi's College) in 1951 illustrated the dilemma facing the development of hurling. Hurling was mainly played by the day pupils, while football was the sport for the boarders. St MacNissi's won the inaugural Mageean Cup in 1963-64, a competition which included St Mary's CBS, St Malachy's College and St Michael's College, Omeath. Eddie Donnelly was a key member of that team.

Thereafter, St Mary's CBS monopolised the Cup for the next couple of decades, during which both St Malachy's and St Michael's faded from the scene. Cross and Passion Convent, Ballycastle became co-educational in the 1970s and entered Colleges' hurling competitions at all levels. However, a lack of boys in Sixth Form restricted them to a 2 Mageean Cup successes (1977/78 & 1978–79) – teams which featured Olcan McFetridge and Brian Donnelly. Cross and Passion now holds 8 titles in total. Armagh CBS were a constant presence during the 1970s and they won their first and so far only title in 1982/3. Paul Doyle was their star, and most of that team went on to represent Armagh at county level.

St Patrick's Maghera emerged as a force at under-age level during the early 1980s and took the first of their 14 titles in 1983/4. That inaugural victory was fashioned by the McGurk and Downey brothers, who would also drive Queen's University to their last appearance in a Fitzgibbon final in 1987. Maghera also won the Mageean – MacRory Cup double on three occasions during the 1980s, a quite exceptional feat given that many players featured on both teams. This double had previously been accomplished by St Mary's CBS in 1971; in fact, St Mary's went on to win the All Ireland double (the Hogan and O’Keefe Cups) in that year. St Louis Ballymena completed a decade of change in Mageean Cup hurling by winning their first title in 1988-9, under coach Alex Connolly and featuring future Antrim goalie Shane Elliott.

St Mary's CBS however has remained the dominant force, adding a further 11 titles during the past 30 years, bringing their total to 28. De La Salle College Belfast reached the Mageean Cup final in 1993-4 and again in 1999-200 but has so far failed to collect the trophy. A recent innovation in 2011/12 has been the entry of an amalgamated team representing ‘An Dún’, and this has been followed in 2012-13 by the emergence of another amalgamation viz ‘Divis’ which is a combination of North and West Belfast schools (excluding St Mary's CBGS).

The Mageean Cup champions go on to represent Ulster each Spring in the All Ireland B Championship (The Paddy Buggy Cup “Formerly O’ Keeffe Cup”), and the Ulster champions have created a remarkable record in the past 4 years. St Mary's CBGS won the O'Keefe Cup in 1971 and 1973, but there was no further Ulster success in the next 30 years until St Patrick's Maghera ended the drought in 2007. In 2009 Cross & Passion Ballycastle initiated a remarkable run of 4 consecutive O'Keefe Cups for Ulster. They retained their title in 2010, Maghera collected their second in 2011, and St Mary's CBGS took their total to 3 in March 2012.

County hurling teams at various levels in Ulster look and travel southwards with apprehension and even trepidation, but the standard bearers in Ulster Colleges have progressed in skill and attitude to the extent that they now expect to beat their opponents from the other provinces.

Finals listed by year

References 

Hurling cup competitions